The Blue Riband is an accolade given to the passenger ship that held the fastest record for transatlantic crossing.

Blue Riband may also refer to:
 Blue Riband (biscuits), chocolate biscuits made by Nestlé
 Blue Riband gin, an Indian gin made by United Spirits Limited
 Nastro Azzurro, an Italian lager made by Peroni

In sports and motorcycling 
 The Blue Riband Trial Stakes, a flat horse race in the United Kingdom for three-year-old thoroughbreds
 Blue Riband (greyhounds), a former category one greyhound competition
 100 meter freestyle, a swimming event
 British Motorcyclists Federation Blue Riband award for advanced motorcycling

See also
Order of the Garter
Blue ribbon (disambiguation)